Conspiration is the second extended play by Swedish pop boy band The Fooo. It was released in Sweden through The Artist House Stockholm on 27 August 2014. The album peaked at number 19 on the Swedish Albums Chart.

Singles
"All Over the World" was released as the lead single from the EP on 8 July 2014.

Track listing

Charts

Weekly charts

Release history

References

2014 EPs
FO&O albums